A by-election was held on 18 June 2022 for the Queensland Legislative Assembly seat of Callide following the resignation of Colin Boyce to contest the 2022 federal election.

Background

2020 election results

Key dates

Candidates

Results

See also 

 List of Queensland state by-elections
 Politics of Queensland

References

External links 
Callide By-election – Electoral Commission Queensland

2022 Callide state by-election
2022 elections in Australia